Mykyta Volodymyrovych Alieksieiev (born 18 May 1993), better known by his mononym Alekseev, is a Ukrainian singer and songwriter. He first began his career in 2014 after placing as a semifinalist on season four of The Voice of Ukraine. He subsequently released the single "Pyanoye solntse", which went on to become a number-one hit throughout the CIS and kickstarted his music career. He represented Belarus in the Eurovision Song Contest 2018 in Portugal with his song "Forever".

Early life 
Alekseev was born on 18 May 1993 in Ukraine's capital of Kyiv from a mixed Ukrainian-Russian family, with a root in Belarus too. Prior to his birth, his biological father left the family as he didn't want to become a parent and later moved to Israel. Alekseev remains estranged from him, but has spoken of his willingness to meet him.

When he was one and a half years old, Alekseev and his mother moved to her family in Chita, Russia, where they stayed for two years. Then, they returned to Kyiv, where Alekseev went to live in a small multiple household flat in the Livoberezhnyi Masyv. He enrolled in the local music school, where he, in 2005, tried to represent Ukraine in the Junior Eurovision Song Contest with a self-written song.

As a child, Alekseev spent several summers in Mula, Spain, where he lived with a Spanish foster family. At one stage, he lived there up to eight months a year. In 2018, during a pre-party for Eurovision, he met the family again for the first time in over a decade.

At the age of 12, Alekseev became very interested in music and singing and was taught by Konstantin Pona. He later started his own band called "Mova". He later graduated from the Kyiv National University of Trade and Economics with a degree in marketing.

Since 2018, he has been dating Ukrainian-Russian singer Ulyana Sinetskaya.

Career

The Voice
During The Voice blind auditions, Ani Lorak turned her chair for Alekseev, but he did not go beyond the 1st live broadcast. As a consolation prize, Ani Lorak helped Alekseev shoot the music video for his debut single "Everything is in Time". But he did not gain popularity until after he appeared on Voice of the County: Reload where he covered Iryna Bilyk's "I'm Drowning" and shot a music video for it.

Debut – 2017 
In September 2015, Alekseev released Pyanoye solntse (Drunken Sun), with lyrics by Vitaly Kurovsky and music by Rusland Quint. The next month, a music video directed by Alan Badoev in which Alekseev kills his alter ego after breaking up with a girl, was shot. In late May 2016, he received the RU.TV award for best song. He also received a Yuna Award for "Drunken Sun". The subsequent singles, "Shards of Dreams", "Became Oceans" and "Feeling Soul", had their music videos also directed by Alan Badoev. On 29 June 2016, he performed the song at Miss Ukraine Universe 2016.

In June 2016, Alekseev won Breakthrough Artist of The Year at the Russian MUZ-TV Awards and Breakthrough Artist of The Year at the Ukrainian M1 Music Awards in December 2016. In March 2017, the artist won ZD Awards and Top Hit Music Awards in several categories: "Breakthrough Artist of The Year", "Artist of The Year", "Take-Off of The Year", "Most Frequently Played on The Radio" for the track Drunken Sun and "Most Popular Radio Artist".

On 14 February 2017, Alekseev started his first Ukrainian Tour. The final show took place on the artist's birthday, 18 May, at the Oktyabrsky Palace.

Eurovision Song Contest 
One week after applying for the Ukrainian contest Vidbir, it was revealed that Alekseev had revoked his bid. It was then later revealed that he entered into Belarus' contest instead. There was controversy following Alekseev's entry. Eurovision rules state that the song performed is not allowed to have been performed before 1 September of the previous year. Alekseev, however, had been performing a Russian song named "Навсегда" at his concerts. He then shortened the song and translated the lyrics to English to get around this rule. On 15 January 2018, an article emerged claiming that 11 other finalists in the Belarus contest were threatening to withdraw if Alekseev was allowed to qualify for the contests' final.

However, on 16 February 2018, Alekseev won the Belarus National Selection and represented the country at the 2018 Eurovision Song Contest in Lisbon, Portugal.

After Eurovision Song Contest
In November 2018, it became known that the artist began to cooperate with Sony Music Entertainment (Russia).

Discography

Studio albums

EPs

Singles

Music videos

Filmography

Awards and nominations

Notes

References

External links

1993 births
Musicians from Kyiv
Living people
Ukrainian pop singers
Eurovision Song Contest entrants for Belarus
Eurovision Song Contest entrants of 2018
Kyiv National University of Trade and Economics alumni
The Voice of Ukraine contestants
Ukrainian people of Russian descent
Ukrainian people of Belarusian descent
21st-century Ukrainian male singers
Russian National Music Award winners